HD 212771 b is an extrasolar planet orbiting the G-type star HD 212771 approximately 364 light years away in the constellation Aquarius.

Nomenclature 
HD 212771 b is named Victoriapeak. The name was selected in the NameExoWorlds campaign by Hong Kong, during the 100th anniversary of the IAU. It is named after the Victoria Peak, the highest point on Hong Kong Island. The host star HD 212771 is named Lionrock, after the Lion Rock.

Properties

Orbit 
HD 212771 b's orbit period and distance are similar to Earth's, with the values being 380 days and 1.19 AU respectively. It orbits in a nearly perfect circular orbit compared to long period gas giants.

Characteristics 

Due to the unknown orbital parameters, the planets true mass is not known, with a minimum of 2.39 times Jupiter's mass. HD 212771 b's radius is unknown, so NASA's Eyes on Exoplanets gives an estimate of 1.18 times the radius.

See also
 HD 4313 b
 HD 181342 b
 HD 206610 b
 HD 180902 b
 HD 136418 b

References

External links
 

Exoplanets discovered in 2009
Exoplanets detected by radial velocity
Aquarius (constellation)
Giant planets
Exoplanets with proper names